Ergo decedo, Latin for "therefore I leave" or "then I go off", a truncation of argumentum ergo decedo, and colloquially denominated the traitorous critic fallacy, denotes responding to the criticism of a critic by implying that the critic is motivated by undisclosed favorability or affiliation to an out-group, rather than responding to the criticism itself. The fallacy implicitly alleges that the critic does not appreciate the values and customs of the criticized group or is traitorous, and thus suggests that the critic should avoid the question or topic entirely, typically by leaving the criticized group.

Argumentum ergo decedo is generally categorized as a species of informal fallacy and more specifically as a species of the subclass of ad hominem informal fallacies.

In politics 

Argumentum ergo decedo is directly related to the tu quoque fallacy when responding to political criticism. As whataboutism is used against external criticism, ergo decedo is used against internal criticism.

Examples 
Critic: "I think we need to work on improving Nauru's taxation system. The current system suffers from multiple issues that have been resolved in other places such as Tuvalu and the Marshall Islands."
Respondent "Well, if you don't like it, why don't you just leave and go somewhere you think is better?"

Critic: "Our office's atmosphere is unsuitable for starting constructive conversations about reforms for the future of the company. A number of improvements are needed."
Respondent "Well, if you don't like the corporate system, then why are you here? You should just leave!"

See also 
 List of logical fallacies
 Ad hominem
 No True Scotsman
 Tu quoque
 Whataboutism

References

Genetic fallacies
Latin logical phrases
Propaganda techniques
Informal fallacies